Bièvre may refer to:

 Bièvre (river), river in France
 Bièvre, Belgium, municipality in the province of Namur